Lake Victoria or Victoria Lake may refer to:
Lake Victoria, a lake in Africa
in Australia:
Lake Victoria (New South Wales), a lake in New South Wales, Australia
Lake Victoria (Victoria), a shallow saline lake on the Bellarine Peninsula in Victoria, Australia
Lake Victoria, one of the Gippsland Lakes in Victoria, Australia
Lake Victoria, Michigan, United States, a small lake and census-designated place
Lake Victoria (Minnesota), a lake in Douglas County, Minnesota
Laguna Victoria, a lake in Bolivia
Victoria Lake (Newfoundland and Labrador), a lake in Canada
Victoria Lake (New Zealand), a lake in Hagley Park, Christchurch, New Zealand
Zorkul, a lake on the border between Afghanistan and Tajikistan once known as Lake Victoria

See also
Queen Victoria Sea